David Jack (1899–1958) was an English footballer.

David Jack may also refer to:
 David Jacks (businessman) (born David Jack, 1822–1909), Scottish-born American landowner in California, marketed Monterey Jack cheese
 David Russell Jack (1864–1913), Canadian author, editor, publisher and politician
 Sir David Emmanuel Jack (1918–1998), Governor-General of Saint Vincent and the Grenadines
 Sir David Jack (pharmacologist) (1924–2011), Scottish pharmacologist who became research and development director of Glaxo
 Dave Jack, Canadian ice hockey player for Asiago Hockey 1935 in 1977–78
 David Jack (musician) (born 1960), American children's performer and tap dancer

See also
 Jack Davie (1874–1922), Australian rules footballer
 Jack Davey (1907–1959), New Zealand-born Australian performer
 Jack Davey (cricketer) (born 1944), English left-handed batsman
 David Jacks (footballer) (born 1948), Australian rules footballer